Division 4 is an Australian television police drama series made by Crawford Productions for the Nine Network between 1969 and 1975 for 301 episodes.

Synopsis 
 
The series was one of the first dramas to follow up on the enormous success of the earlier Crawford Productions crime show Homicide and dealt with the wide variety of cases dealt with by police in the fictional Melbourne suburb of Yarra Central (modelled on St Kilda).

Awards
 
The series was both popular - winning 10 Logie Awards, including two Gold Logie awards (for Australia's most popular entertainer) for Gerard Kennedy - who played Frank Banner, the series was critically acclaimed, winning a number of Penguin and Awgie awards for its scripts and actors.

In 1972 Frank Taylor received the Penguin Award for the Best Supporting Actor in a Television Series.
 
After Kennedy decided to leave Division 4, the Nine Network summarily cancelled the series; only one episode was made with his replacement John Stanton.

Theme song 
 
The opening theme Power Drive by Johnny Pearson was sampled by TISM in their 1998 single Thunderbirds Are Coming Out.

Regular cast

Home media
As of February 2017, twelve volumes of this series have been released on DVD through Crawfords/WinTV, representing the entire series run (with the exception of episode 102A "Conspiracy", which exists as a partial episode only and was not included).

References

External links
Division 4 at Classic Australian Television
Division 4 at Crawford Productions
Division 4 at the National Film and Sound Archive
Division 4 - "Return of John Kelso" at Australian Screen Online

Nine Network original programming
1960s Australian drama television series
1960s Australian crime television series
1969 Australian television series debuts
1975 Australian television series endings
Television shows set in Victoria (Australia)
Black-and-white Australian television shows
Television series by Crawford Productions
1970s Australian drama television series
1970s Australian crime television series